Llanberis (SMR) railway station is the lower terminus of the Snowdon Mountain Railway, located in Llanberis, Gwynedd, Wales.

The station opened with the railway on 6 April 1896, but closed the same day following an accident. It reopened on 9 April 1897, without mishap and has operated since, even throughout most of the Second World War, as there was military activity near the mountaintop.

The station has two platforms. The first stretch of line is uphill at 1 in 50, steep for a main line but shallow compared with the 1 in 6 incline that begins shortly afterwards. The line's engine shed and workshop are visible from the platform ends.

References

Sources

External links

 The station and line via Snowdon Mountain Railway
 Edwardian 6" map showing the station, overlain with modern satellite images and maps, via National Library of Scotland
 The station and line, via Rail Map Online
 Images of the station and line, via Yahoo

Railway stations in Great Britain opened in 1896
Llanberis
Heritage railway stations in Gwynedd